Hypselostoma is a genus of very small air-breathing land snails, terrestrial pulmonate gastropod mollusks in the family Vertiginidae, the whorl snails.

Species 
Species within the genus Hypselostoma include:

 Hypselostoma annamiticum Möllendorff, 1900
 Hypselostoma banmiensis Panha & J. B. Burch, 2004
 Hypselostoma benetuitum Vermeulen, Luu, Theary & Anker, 2019
 Hypselostoma bensonianum Blanford, 1863
 Hypselostoma cambodjense Van Benthem Jutting, 1962
 Hypselostoma cucumensis Panha, 1997
 Hypselostoma dayanum Stoliczka, 1871
 Hypselostoma dilatatum van Benthem Jutting, 1962
 Hypselostoma discobasis Vermeulen, Luu, Theary & Anker, 2019
 Hypselostoma dohertyi Fulton, 1899
 Hypselostoma edentata Panha & J. B. Burch, 1999
 Hypselostoma edentulum Moellendorff, 1894
 Hypselostoma erawan Panha & J. B. Burch, 2002
 Hypselostoma holimanae F. G. Thompson & Lee, 1988
 Hypselostoma insularum Pilsbry, 1908
 Hypselostoma kentingensis C.-C. Hwang, 2014
 Hypselostoma khaochongpran Panha & J. B. Burch, 2002
 Hypselostoma khaowongensis Panha, 1997
 Hypselostoma lacrima Páll-Gergely & Hunyadi, 2015
 Hypselostoma latispira F. G. Thompson & Auffenberg, 1984
 Hypselostoma loei Panha & Prateespasen, 2005
 Hypselostoma luzonicum Moellendorff, 1888
 Hypselostoma neglecta van Benthem-Jutting, 1961
 Hypselostoma panhai J. B. Burch & Tongkerd, 2002
 Hypselostoma pattalungensis Panha & J. B. Burch, 2004
 Hypselostoma piconis van Benthem-Jutting, 1949
 Hypselostoma polyodon Moellendorff, 1896
 Hypselostoma pusillum Moellendorff, 1894
 Hypselostoma quadrasi Moellendorff, 1896
 Hypselostoma rochebruni Mabille, 1887
 Hypselostoma roebeleni Moellendorff, 1894
 Hypselostoma rupestre van Benthem Jutting, 1962
 Hypselostoma satulensis Panha & J. B. Burch, 2004
 Hypselostoma sibuyanicum Moellendorff, 1896
 Hypselostoma smokon Panha & J. B. Burch, 2004
 Hypselostoma socialis Páll-Gergely & Hunyadi, 2015
 Hypselostoma taehwani Panha & J. B. Burch, 2002
 Hypselostoma tubiferum Benson, 1856
 Hypselostoma utongensis Panha & J. B. Burch, 2004

References 

Vertiginidae
Taxa named by William Henry Benson